Firuzabad may refer to:

Castle 

 Firuzabad castle, a castle in Sarbaz County, Sistan and Baluchestan Province, Iran

Azerbaijan
Firuzabad, Azerbaijan, a village in Azerbaijan

India
Firozabad, a city in Uttar Pradesh, India

Iran

Alborz Province
Firuzabad, Alborz, a village in Nazarabad County, Alborz Province, Iran

Ardabil Province
Firuzabad, Ardabil, a village in Ardabil County
Firuzabad, Kowsar, a village in Kowsar County
Firuzabad, Parsabad, a village in Parsabad County

Chaharmahal and Bakhtiari Province
Firuzabad, Chaharmahal and Bakhtiari, a village in Kiar County

Fars Province
Firuzabad, Fars, a city in Fars Province, Iran
Firuzabad County, an administrative subdivision of Fars Province, Iran

Hamadan Province
Firuzabad, Asadabad, a village in Asadabad County
Firuzabad, Hamadan, a village in Hamadan County
Firuzabad, Malayer, a village in Malayer County
Firuzabad-e Sofla, a village in Nahavand County
Firuzabad-e Tayemeh, a village in Nahavand County

Isfahan Province
Firuzabad, Isfahan, a village in Isfahan County

Kerman Province
Firuzabad, Fahraj, a village in Fahraj County
Firuzabad, Kerman, a village in Kerman County
Firuzabad, Rudbar-e Jonubi, a village in Rudbar-e Jonubi County
Firuzabad, Pariz, a village in Sirjan County
Firuzabad, Zarand, a village in Zarand County

Kermanshah Province
Firuzabad, Eslamabad-e Gharb, a village in Eslamabad-e Gharb County
Firuzabad District (Kermanshah Province), an administrative subdivision of Kermanshah Province, Iran
Firuzabad-e Kuchak, a village in Kangavar County
Firuzabad-e Tappeh, a village in Kangavar County
Firuzabad-e Pacheqa, a village in Kermanshah County
Firuzabad, Sonqor, a village in Sonqor County

Khuzestan Province
Firuzabad, Dasht-e Azadegan, a village in Dasht-e Azadegan County
Firuzabad, Dezful, a village in Dezful County
Firuzabad, Hendijan, a village in Hendijan County

Kurdistan Province
Firuzabad, Kurdistan, a village in Qorveh County

Lorestan Province
Firuzabad, Lorestan, a city in Lorestan province, Iran
Firuzabad, Zaz va Mahru, a village in Zaz va Mahru District, Aligudarz County
Firuzabad District (Selseleh County), an administrative subdivision of Lorestan province, Iran
Firuzabad Rural District, an administrative division of Lorestan province, Iran

Mazandaran Province
Firuzabad, Bandpey-ye Gharbi, a village in Babol County
Firuzabad, Bandpey-ye Sharqi, a village in Babol County
Firuzabad, Nowshahr, a village in Nowshahr County

North Khorasan Province
Firuzabad, North Khorasan, a village in North Khorasan Province, Iran

Razavi Khorasan Province
Firuzabad, Bardaskan, a village in Bardaskan County
Firuzabad, Mashhad, a village in Mashhad County
Firuzabad, Quchan, a village in Quchan County
Firuzabad, Zaveh, a village in Zaveh County

Semnan Province
Firuzabad, Damghan, a village in Damghan County
Firuzabad, Amirabad, a village in Damghan County
Firuzabad-e Bala, a village in Shahrud County
Firuzabad-e Pain, a village in Shahrud County

Sistan and Baluchestan Province
Firuzabad, Bampur-e Gharbi, a village in Bampur County
Firuzabad, Bampur-e Sharqi, a village in Bampur County

South Khorasan Province
Firuzabad, Nehbandan, a village in Nehbandan County
Firuzabad, Qaen, a village in Qaen County
Firuzabad, Tabas, a village in Tabas County

Tehran Province
Firuzabad, Tehran, a village in Rey County

West Azerbaijan Province
Firuzabad, West Azerbaijan, a village in Miandoab County
Firuzabad District (Chaharborj County)

Yazd Province
Firuzabad, Abarkuh, a village in Abarkuh County
Firuzabad, Sabzdasht, a village in Bafq County